Lethabo Sebetso (born 26 May 1996), professionally known as Focalistic, is a South African rapper. Born and raised in Pretoria, Sebetso was a footballer  prior pursuing a music career as a rapper, released his debut studio album  Sgubhu Ses Excellent (2020).

Career 
Lethabo Sebetso born 26 May 1996 in Zone 6, Ga-Rankuwa, Pretoria, his father Kgomotso Sebetso was the former political journalist working  at SABC. Lethabo graduated at the University of Pretoria in political science degree. In 2016, he won Artist on Rise competition. His single "Fak'mali" debuted number 1 on YFM Hip Hop music charts. In early 2020, he established his own record label 18 Area Holdings in partnership with The Vth Seasons.    On 10 April 2020, his Extended Play Quarantined Tarantino was released. In April 2020, his single "Ke Star" featuring Virgo Deep was released. "Ke Star" was certified gold with sales of 25 000 copies.

In November 2020, he joined RADAR African programme by Spotify. Focalistic revealed track listing and announced release date in 25 November. Sghubu Ses Excellent was released on 4 December 2020.

In February 2021, his remix  "Ke Star", featuring Davido and Virgo Deep was released globally. The single received enormous international success and charted at number 16 on  Billboard Top Triller Global chart in the U.S. At 2021 All Africa Music Awards he received  seven nominations in the Best male artiste, Artiste of the Year, Best African collaborations, Best Artiste African dance, Best Artiste in African Electro, Break out artiste of the year, Song of the Year.

In early September 2021, he headlined to AmaFest Tour in the UK, to further promote Amapiano genre. In 27 September, his studio Extended Play, President Ya Straata, was released with its  lead single, "16 Days No Sleep", featuring Kabza De Small, DJ Maphorisa and Mellow & Sleazy.
Focalistic was nominated for Best African Act at MTV Europe Music Awards in 2021.

In early March 2022, Focalistic performed at 02 Arena in London alongside  with Nigerian singer Davido.

In 1 May, he embarked on North American Tour, the tour will visit 12 cities includes; Washington D.C, Houston, Dallas, Orlando, Minnesota, Los Angeles, San Francisco, Chicago, Atlanta and New York.

In October 15, he announced his studio album Ghetto King which was set to be released on November 18, 2022.

"Tabela Hape" featuring Kabza de Small, Mellow and Sleazy, and Myztro  is scheduled to be released on October 28, 2022, as album's lead single.

Ghetto Gospel was released on November 18, 2022.

Personal life 
His father Kgomotso Sebetso died in a car accident in his hometown of Ga-Rankuwa in 2011.

Focalistic is dating South African DJ DBN Gogo.

Discography 
 Sgubu ses Excellent (2020)
 President Ya Straata (2021)
 Ghetto Gospel (2022)

Awards and nominations

All Africa Music Awards 

! 
|-
|2022
|Himself 
|Best Male Artist in Southern Africa
|
|

African Muzik Magazine Awards 

! 
|-
| rowspan ="3"|2021
| rowspan="3"|Ke star (Remix)"
| Best Collaboration
| 
| rowspan="3"|
|-
| Best Male Southern Africa
| 
|-
| Song of the Year
|

Headies 

!
|-
|2022
|Himself
|Best Southern African Artiste Of The Year
|
|

Nickelodeon Kids' Choice Awards 

! 
|-
|2022
| Himself
|Favourite African Star
|
|

Vodafone Ghana Music Awards 

! 
|-
|2022
| Himself
|Best African Artist
|
|

South African Music Awards 

! 
|-
|2022
|President Ya Straata
|Best Amapiano Album
|
|

References 

Living people
1996 births
South African rappers
People from Pretoria
Amapiano musicians